Looking For Stars is a MediaCorp-produced drama serial that starred celebrity couple Fann Wong and Christopher Lee. It tells the story of two star-crossed lovers who have to live with each other's quirks, idiosyncrasies and foibles after a one-night stand in Tokyo.

Cast 
 Fann Wong - Orange
 Christopher Lee - Henry Lu Haoye
 San Yow - Tequila
 Vivian Lai - Peggy
 Xiang Yun - Zheng Baozhu
 Liang Tian - Orange's grandfather
 Cynthia Koh - Cai Feifei

Awards & Nominations

External links 

Looking for Stars (English) on Mediacorp website

Singapore Chinese dramas
2000s romance television series